WinFiles, formerly Windows95.com, was an Internet download directory website. Originally, it was founded by Steve Jenkins in 1994.

CNET buyout 

On February 24, 1999, CNET agreed to pay WinFiles owner Jenesys LLC US$5.75 million and made an additional $5.75 million payment 18 months after the closing of the deal - totaling $11.5 million.

References

External links 

 WinFiles.com
 Classic WinFiles.com
 WinFiles.com.ru

Internet properties established in 1994
Former CBS Interactive websites
File hosting
Download websites